Tetratheca halmaturina, also known as curly pink-bells, is a species of plant in the quandong family that is endemic to Australia.

Description
The species grows as a compact shrub, usually to 20 cm (sometimes up to 50 cm) in height. The oval to rhomboidal leaves are 2–4 mm long and are often reduced to triangular scales on the upper branches. The dark pink flowers each have five 8–13 mm long petals, appearing from July to December.

Distribution and habitat
The species is endemic to Kangaroo Island, South Australia, where it is found mainly in the northern and western parts of the island in shrubland.

References

halmaturina
Flora of Kangaroo Island
Oxalidales of Australia
Taxa named by John McConnell Black
Plants described in 1924